Janez Vesel (12 September 1798 – 26 March 1884), known by his pen name Jovan Koseski (Slovene conventions also include the names  and, less often,  or ) was a Slovene lawyer and poet.

Life and work

Vesel was born in Gorenje (now part of Spodnje Koseze) in the Duchy of Carniola in the Habsburg monarchy (now in Slovenia) and baptized Johannes Vesseu. He studied law in Graz and Vienna and worked in Trieste for most of his professional life. In his student years, he mostly wrote in German. In 1818, his sonnet  (The Comfort) was the first sonnet ever printed in Slovene. No further works by Koseski are known until 1844, when he published his ode  (Slovenia to Emperor Ferdinand), dedicated to Emperor Ferdinand. The poem where he describes the history of the Slovene Lands since the Roman times is widely regarded as his best work. Afterwards, he continued writing and also translating poetry. Vesel was a grandfather of the Austrian-Italian mountaineer and author Julius Kugy. He died in Trieste.

The word Slovenija
Vesel's 1844 ode was long considered the earliest known printed use of the word  'Slovenia', at the time referring to the Slovene Lands. In the early 1990s, it was found that the word was already printed in 1841 in the book  (The Ancient and Modern Slovenes) by the Russian writer Yuriy Venelin.

Notes

References 

1798 births
1884 deaths
People from the Municipality of Lukovica
Slovenian poets
Slovenian male poets
Carniolan poets
Carniolan lawyers
19th-century poets
19th-century Carniolan writers
Sonneteers